Pierre Henri Leroux (7 April 1797 – 12 April 1871) was a French philosopher and political economist. He was born at Bercy, now a part of Paris, the son of an artisan.

Life 

His education was interrupted by the death of his father, which compelled him to support his mother and family. Having worked first as a mason and then as a compositor, he joined P. Dubois in the foundation of Le Globe which became in 1831 the official organ of the Saint-Simonian community, of which he became a prominent member. In November of the same year, when Prosper Enfantin became leader of the Saint-Simonians and preached the enfranchisement of women and the functions of the couple-prétre, Leroux separated himself from the sect. In 1834, he published an essay entitled "Individualism and Socialism" which, despite its message of scepticism towards both tendencies, introduced the term socialism in French political discourse. In 1838, with Jean Reynaud, who had seceded with him, he founded the Encyclopédie nouvelle (eds. 1838–1841). Amongst the articles which he inserted in it were De l'egalité and Refutation de l'éclectisme, which afterwards appeared as separate works.

In 1840, he published his treatise De l'humanité (2nd ed. 1845), which contains the fullest exposition of his system, and was regarded as the philosophical manifesto of the Humanitarians. In 1841 he established the Revue indépendante, with the aid of George Sand, over whom he had great influence. Her Spiridion, which was dedicated to him, Sept cordes de la lyre, Consuelo, and La Comtesse de Rudolstadt, were written under the Humanitarian inspiration. Leroux also became embroiled in the philosophical controversy between F.W.J. Schelling and the Young Hegelians in the early 1840s. A favourable comment about Schelling prompted a public reply from Hegel's disciple Karl Rosenkranz. Leroux continued to take an interest in German philosophy and literature; he also translated and commented on some writings by Goethe.

In 1843, he established at Boussac (Creuse) a printing association organized according to his systematic ideas, and founded the Revue sociale. At the outbreak of the Revolution of 1848 Leroux proclaimed the republic in the town of Boussac, becoming its mayor on February 25. Subsequently, he was elected to the Constituent Assembly, and in 1849 to the Legislative Assembly, where he sat with the radical socialist deputies and often spoke, though his speeches were criticised as abstract and mystical. Within the Assembly, Leroux represented the Seine Department. 

An opponent of Louis Bonaparte, Leroux went into exile after the coup d'état of 1851, settling with his family in Jersey, where he pursued agricultural experiments and wrote his socialist poem La Grève de Samarez. Marx nominated Leroux for the Central Committee of the International Workingmen's Association. On the definitive amnesty of 1869 he returned to Paris. He supported the Paris Commune but died before its suppression.

Views 

Leroux's fundamental philosophical principle is that of what he calls the "triad"—a triplicity which he finds to pervade all things, which in God is "power, intelligence and love," in man "sensation, sentiment and knowledge".

Leroux was described as a Protestant. His religious doctrine is pantheistic; and, rejecting the belief in a future life as commonly conceived, he substitutes for it a theory of metempsychosis. In social economy he preserves the family, country and property, but finds in all three, as they now are, a despotism which must be eliminated. He imagines certain combinations by which this triple tyranny can be abolished. His solution seems to require the creation of families without heads, countries without governments and property without right of possession. In politics he advocates absolute equality — a democracy.

See also 
Liberté, égalité, fraternité
French demonstration of 15 May 1848
Circulus (theory)

Notes

References
  This work in turn cites:
 Raillard, Célestin (1899). Pierre Leroux at ses œuvres. Paris.
 Reybaud, Louis (1842). Études sur les réformateurs et socialistes modernes. Brussels.
 Thomas, Pierre-Félix (1904). Pierre Leroux: sa vie, son œuvre, sa doctrine. Paris.
 article in R. H. Inglis Palgrave (ed). Dictionary of Political Economy.

Further reading 
  J. Maîtron (ed. by), Dictionnaire biographique du mouvement ouvrier français. Première partie: 1789-1864 (Paris, 1964): t. II, pp. 501–503.
 Jack Bakunin, Pierre Leroux and the birth of democratic socialism, 1797-1848 (New York, 1976)
 Jacques Viard, Pierre Leroux et les socialistes européens (Arles, 1982)
 Armelle Le Bras-Chopard, De l'égalité dans la différence : le socialisme de Pierre Leroux (Paris, 1986)
 Marisa Forcina, I diritti dell’esistente. La filosofia della “Encyclopédie nouvelle” (1833-1847) (Lecce, 1987)
 Barbel Kuhn, Pierre Leroux: Sozialismus zwischen analytischer Gesellschaftskritik und sozialphilosophischer Synthese: ein Beitrag zur methodischen Erforschung des vormarxistischen Sozialismus (Frankfurt am Main, 1988)
 Miguel Abensour, Le Procès des maîtres rêveurs (Paris, 2000)
 Bruno Viard, Pierre Leroux, penseur de l’humanité (Aix-en-Provence, 2009)
 Andrea Lanza, All'abolizione del proletariato! Il discorso socialista fraternitario. Parigi 1839-1847 (Milano, 2010)

External links
Biographical sketch (in Italian)
Biographical sketch (in French).  Site discusses intellectual background of George Sand.
http://www.amisdepierreleroux.org (in French)
"Individualism and Socialism" (in English)

1798 births
1871 deaths
Writers from Paris
Politicians from Paris
The Mountain (1849) politicians
Members of the 1848 Constituent Assembly
Members of the National Legislative Assembly of the French Second Republic
Pantheists
French philosophers
Saint-Simonists
19th-century philosophers
French economists
French socialists
Utopian socialists
Forty-Eighters
French male writers
19th-century male writers